This is a list of Howard Bison football players in the NFL Draft.

Key

Selections

References

Howard

Howard Bison NFL Draft